Jerome Daniels (born September 13, 1974) is a former American football guard and tackle. He was drafted 4th round 121 pick to Miami Dolphins and played for Baltimore Ravens in 1997 Arizona Cardinals in 1998-2001 and for the New York/New Jersey Hitmen in 2001-2002
.

References

1974 births
Living people
American football offensive guards
American football offensive tackles
Northeastern Huskies football players
Arizona Cardinals players
New York/New Jersey Hitmen players
Bloomfield High School (Connecticut) alumni